Old Rye is a small town in eastern Jutland, Denmark, with a population of 1,570 (1 January 2022).

Rye was a very important market town in medieval Denmark. In 1534 AD, St. Søren's Church in Rye was the setting of the Election of Christian III as king of Denmark. Today, the town has been outgrown by the new town of Ry which, like so many other towns in Denmark, sprouted up around a railway station.

Notable people 
 Helle Virkner (born 1925 in Old Rye) a famous Danish actress and spouse of Prime Minister Jens Otto Krag
 Christina Siggaard (born 1994 in Old Rye) a Danish professional racing cyclist
 Mads Emil Madsen (born 1998 in Old Rye) a Danish footballer, who plays for Silkeborg IF

References

Cities and towns in the Central Denmark Region
Skanderborg Municipality